Central Signal is a railway station on the Taiwan Railways Administration (TRA) South-link line located in Shizi Township, Pingtung County, Taiwan. The site is located outside the west gate of the Central Tunnel.

History 
The station was opened on 5 October 1992.

See also 
 List of railway stations in Taiwan

References

External links 

1992 establishments in Taiwan
Railway signal stations in Taiwan
Railway stations in Pingtung County
Railway stations opened in 1992
Railway stations served by Taiwan Railways Administration